Racine Coly (born 8 December 1995) is a Senegalese professional footballer who last played as a defender for Primeira Liga club Estoril.

Club career
On 31 August 2017, Coly joined French Ligue 1 side Nice.

On 26 January 2021, Coly moved to French Ligue 2 club Amiens, on a loan deal until the end of the season.

He transferred to the Primeira Liga club Estoril on 3 June 2021.

International career
Coly made one appearance for the Senegal U20s at the 2015 African U-20 Championship in a 2–1 semi-final win over Mali U20 on 19 March 2015.

References

External links
 

1995 births
Living people
Footballers from Dakar
Association football fullbacks
Senegalese footballers
Senegal youth international footballers
Serie B players
Ligue 1 players
Primeira Liga players
Brescia Calcio players
OGC Nice players
F.C. Famalicão players
Amiens SC players
G.D. Estoril Praia players
Senegalese expatriate footballers
Senegalese expatriate sportspeople in Italy
Senegalese expatriate sportspeople in France
Senegalese expatriate sportspeople in Portugal
Expatriate footballers in Italy
Expatriate footballers in France
Expatriate footballers in Portugal